Aidomyia is a genus of flies in the family Stratiomyidae.

Species
Aidomyia femoralis Kertész, 1916
Aidomyia glabrifrons James, 1977
Aidomyia nitens James, 1977
Aidomyia snyderi James, 1962
Aidomyia tomentosa James, 1977

References

Stratiomyidae
Brachycera genera
Taxa named by Kálmán Kertész
Diptera of Asia
Diptera of Australasia